Ampadu is a surname. Notable people with the surname include:

Ethan Ampadu (born 2000), Welsh footballer
Kwame Ampadu (born 1970), English footballer
Michael Ampadu (born 1997), Ghanaian footballer
Naana Agyei-Ampadu, British actress of Ghanaian descent
Nana Ampadu (1945-2021), Ghanaian musician